Louis Hector (March 19, 1883 – October 1968) was an American radio, theater, film, and television actor.  He is best known for his roles of Sherlock Holmes in the 1937 broadcast of The Three Garridebs (the first US televised portrayal of Sir Arthur Conan Doyle's protagonist Holmes); and that of the Reverend Browne in MGM's 1940 Technicolor release of Northwest Passage.

Life and career
Hector was born in March 1883 in England. He started his acting career in Theatre performances in London and Broadway.  He acted in several plays in London, mainly Shakespearean, with actress Jane Cowl before emigrating to the US in 1920, where he appeared in several Broadway productions, including No More Ladies, and Arms and Men; and choreographed duels in Ziegfeld's 1928 musical version of  Three Musketeers.

Hector made his American radio debut on WJZ in New York in 1924, and played many roles on American radio including Long John Silver and William Tell. Hector worked regularly as a radio performer in the 1930s, often portraying Sir Arthur Conan Doyle's protagonist, Sherlock Holmes. Hector was chosen to play Holmes in an early NBC experimental television broadcast of The Three Garridebs on November 27, 1937. This is the first televised adaptation of the Sherlock Holmes character. The show ran for 30 minutes, and was processed in B&W.  The New York Times wrote a positive review of his performance in the teleplay.

Death
Hector died in New York City in early to mid-October 1968, his obituary was published in the New York Times on October 19.

Radio, film, and TV work
Hector performed on radio in the NBC Blue network radio series The Adventures of Sherlock Holmes. He played Professor Moriarty in at least one episode, "The Missing Leonardo Da Vinci", which aired on May 19, 1932. From 1934 to 1935, he played Sherlock Holmes in the series. Only three episodes of Hector as Holmes are believed to have survived to 2020. Hector played Holmes in 29 episodes. Many of these episodes, particularly those that aired in 1934 and early 1935, were new stories or based on non-Sherlock Holmes stories by Arthur Conan Doyle (such as "The Case of the Lost Special", which aired on 18 November 1934), while the episodes that aired in 1935 were generally based on Doyle's Sherlock Holmes stories. The episodes in which Hector portrayed Holmes that were based on Doyle's Sherlock Holmes stories include the following:

Hector's other performances include:

Film and TV
 The Three Garridebs; televised play with two pre-filmed segments; 1937; Sherlock Holmes; performed live six times
 Northwest Passage; MGM film; 1940; Reverend Browne
 Tales of Tomorrow; TV series; June 20, 1952;  Dr. Bache
 King Richard II; TV film; 1954; Henry Percy; Hallmark Hall of Fame (#3.18)

Radio
 The Planets: A Modern Allegory; (radio play); 1938; Saturn
 The New Adventures of Sherlock Holmes; radio series, 1939–50; Professor Moriarty; recurring role; NBC Blue radio network and Mutual Broadcasting radio network.
 Great Plays; radio series; 1938–1940; various characters; seven episodes
 Richelieu; radio episode; February 5, 1939; Richelieu
 The Tempest; radio episode; November 24, 1940

Theatre work
 Romeo and Juliet; ; London
 Antony and Cleopatra; ; London
 Pelleas and Melisande; ; London
 The Road to Rome; ; London
 Inherit the Wind; National Theatre, Dayton, Ohio; 1924
 No More Ladies; Broadway; New York
 Arms and Men; Broadway; New York
 Three Musketeers Musical (choreographer); Broadway; New York

References

External links
 
 

1883 births
1968 deaths
British male actors